The  Tampa Bay Storm season was the twenty-seventh season for the franchise in the Arena Football League. The team was coached by Lawrence Samuels and played their home games at the Amalie Arena. The Storm finished the regular season 7–11, and for the second consecutive season, failed to reach the playoffs.

Standings

Schedule

Regular season
The 2015 regular season schedule was released on December 19, 2014.

Roster

References

Tampa Bay Storm
Tampa Bay Storm seasons
Tampa Bay Storm